Caumasee (Romansh: Lag la Cauma or Lai da Cauma) is a lake near Flims, in the Grisons, Switzerland. It is one of the lakes on the Flims Rockslide deposits. The lake is fed from underground sources. Its surface area is 10.3194 ha.

The level of the lake varies by approximately 4 to 5 meters along with the varying underground water flow during the year, hence reaches its minimum by the end of April when snow melting in the mountains increases. A maximum level is reached by mid July but may be topped in August even after previous falling due to summer rain. The very western bay never freezes in winter, probably showing a maximum water flow in this area.

When the lake is at a low level, with a small volume of water, it warms up sooner than most lakes in the region, so people can be seen starting to swim the lake in April while bigger lakes even in lower areas of Switzerland remain rather cool. Water temperature in summer is at an average 21 Celsius, with a maximum around 24 Celsius.

The lake is in a huge forest that was allowed to remain on the agriculturally useless debris area of the biggest prehistoric rockslide in the Alps and can only be reached by a footpath (wheelchair accessible), possibly using Caumasee-Lift, a funicular built in 1939, refurbished in 1988 on its original tracks (running May to October only). The walk from the edge of town to the funicular takes about 10 minutes.

Flow system

As close as 500 yards to the Caumasee is another dell and altering lake, called Lag Tuleritg, which is just about level to the Caumasee; it is just 18 meters higher. This lake dries out completely in autumn and remains empty until being filled by a small river of just about 800m in length, covering some 100 meters difference in altitude. That river will start flowing around May, depending on temperatures and snow melt rate in the mountains. Its origin is another lake, Lag Prau Pulté, which is fed by underground water only in spring, disappearing in autumn and staying dry all winter. During a cold period in spring, water that entered the basin of this lake may disappear again as snow melt decreases and all water remains in the underground flow. Due to its origin, the water of both lakes is grey all summer until the level starts to go down in autumn. In Lag Prau Pulte one can see another special effect caused by air being forced out of the underground; this is causing the lake not only to remain grey but to frequently produce bubbles and therefore different colours can be seen on the surface.

The flow system has been severely attacked by building the Flims Bypass Tunnel when engineers decided to divert some 800 Litres per minute of underground water flow out of the tunnel instead of sealing it into the rock. Further changes occurred when another previously existing basin near the road, which filled with water every year, was landfilled during road constructions. Since 2011 additional water is being fed near the tunnel into the river running from Lag Prau Pulte to Lag Tuleritg to compensate the water loss in the underground system.

A fourth lake, Crestasee, is also fed by underground water but retains a constant level all year.

See also
List of mountain lakes of Switzerland

References

External links
Waterlevels 

Lakes of Switzerland
Lakes of Graubünden
Tourist attractions in Switzerland
Flims